Hildebrandshausen/Lengenfeld unterm Stein is a former Verwaltungsgemeinschaft in the district of Unstrut-Hainich-Kreis in Thuringia, Germany. The seat of the Verwaltungsgemeinschaft was in Lengenfeld unterm Stein. It was disbanded in December 2011.

The Verwaltungsgemeinschaft Hildebrandshausen/Lengenfeld unterm Stein consists of the following municipalities:

 Hildebrandshausen 
 Lengenfeld unterm Stein
 Rodeberg

References

Former Verwaltungsgemeinschaften in Thuringia